Sir Duncan Oppenheim (6 August 1904 St Helens, Lancashire - January 2003 London) was chairman of British American Tobacco (1953-1966), the Council of Industrial Design (1960-1972) and of Chatham House (1966-1971). In 1955 and 1968 he participated in the conference of the Bilderberg Group. He was also a noted arts administrator.

References 

20th-century British businesspeople
British arts administrators
2003 deaths
1904 births